Enrique Floriano Millan (born 9 October 1982 in Lorca, Murcia) is a vision impaired B2/S12 swimmer from Spain.

Personal 
Floriano is from the Extremadura region of Spain. Floriano got a job with help from the Employment HPOD PROAD Program, which is helped by ONCE. In October 2013, he was awarded the Real Orden al Mérito Deportivo.

Swimming 
In 2007, Floriano competed at the IDM German Open.  He competed at the 2000 Summer Paralympics, winning a gold medal in the 400 meter freestyle and 200 meter individual medley race, and a silver medal in the 100 meter backstroke race.  He also won a bronze  in the 4 x 100 meter medley Relay 49 Points race. He competed at the 2004 Summer Paralympics, winning a silver medal in the  400 meter freestyle and in the 4 x 100 meter medley Relay 49 Points race, and a bronze medal in the  200 meter individual medley race. He competed at the 2008 Summer Paralympics, winning a silver medal 400 meter freestyle race. He competed at the 2012 Summer Paralympics, winning a silver medal in the 400 meter freestyle race. Prior to heading to London, she participated in a national vision impaired swim team training camp at the High Performance Centre of Sant Cugat from 6 to 23 August.  Daily at the camp, there were two in water training sessions and one out of water training session. In 2010, he swam at the Tenerife International Open.  He raced at the 2011 IPC European Swimming Championships in Berlin, Germany. Twice, he was one of the top three swimmers in his races. He finished first in the 5 km open water swim.

References

External links 
 
 
 

1982 births
Living people
Spanish male backstroke swimmers
Spanish male breaststroke swimmers
Spanish male freestyle swimmers
Spanish male medley swimmers
Paralympic swimmers of Spain
Paralympic gold medalists for Spain
Paralympic silver medalists for Spain
Paralympic bronze medalists for Spain
Paralympic medalists in swimming
Paralympic swimmers with a vision impairment
S12-classified Paralympic swimmers
Swimmers at the 2000 Summer Paralympics
Swimmers at the 2004 Summer Paralympics
Swimmers at the 2008 Summer Paralympics
Swimmers at the 2012 Summer Paralympics
Medalists at the 2000 Summer Paralympics
Medalists at the 2004 Summer Paralympics
Medalists at the 2008 Summer Paralympics
Medalists at the 2012 Summer Paralympics
Sportspeople from the Region of Murcia
Medalists at the World Para Swimming Championships
Medalists at the World Para Swimming European Championships
Place of birth missing (living people)
Spanish blind people